code_saturne is a general-purpose computational fluid dynamics free computer software package. Developed since 1997 at Électricité de France R&D, code_saturne is distributed under the GNU GPL licence.
It is based on a co-located finite-volume approach that accepts meshes with any type of cell (tetrahedral, hexahedral, prismatic, pyramidal, polyhedral...) and any type of grid structure (unstructured, block structured, hybrid, conforming or with hanging nodes...).

Its basic capabilities enable the handling of either incompressible or expandable flows with or without heat transfer and turbulence (mixing length, 2-equation models, v2f, Reynolds stress models, Large eddy simulation...).
Dedicated modules are available for specific physics such as radiative heat transfer, combustion (gas, coal, heavy fuel oil, ...), magneto-hydro dynamics, compressible flows, two-phase flows (Euler-Lagrange approach with two-way coupling), extensions to specific applications (e.g. for atmospheric environment).

code saturne install 

code_saturne may be installed on a Linux or other Unix-like system by downloading and building it. No system files are changed, so administrator privileges are not required if the code is installed in a user's directory. Packages for code_saturne are also available on Debian and Ubuntu. Alternatively, CAE Linux (latest version ), includes code_saturne pre-installed.

The code also works well in the Windows subsystem for Linux.

Interoperability 

code saturne supports multiple mesh formats. The following formats, from open source or commercial tools, are currently supported by Code Saturne:

Supported mesh input formats (source):
 SIMAIL (NOPO) – (INRIA/Distene)
 I-DEAS universal
 MED
 CGNS
 EnSight 6
 EnSight Gold
 GAMBIT neutral
 Gmsh
 Simcenter STAR-CCM+

Supported post-processing output formats
 EnSight Gold
 MED
 CGNS

Alternative software 
 Advanced Simulation Library (open source software AGPL)
 ANSYS CFX (proprietary software)
 ANSYS Fluent (proprietary software)
 Basilisk
 COMSOL Multiphysics
 FEATool Multiphysics
 Gerris Flow Solver (GPL)
 OpenFOAM (GPL)
 Palabos Flow Solver (AGPL)
 STAR-CCM+ (proprietary software)
 SU2 code (LGPL)

See also 

 SALOME

References

External links 
  Official English website
  Official french website
  Code Saturne Installation on Mandriva Linux
  Code_Saturne Overview (pdf, 2 pages)
  Overview of EDF's Open Source initiative (pdf, 2 pages)
  code-saturne.blogspot.com : Independent user's Blog about SALOME, Code_Saturne, ParaView and Numerical Modelling
  CAE Linux : LiveDVD with Code_Saturne, Code_Aster and the Salomé platform
  Website at the University of Manchester

Computational fluid dynamics
Free science software
Engineering software that uses Qt
Computer-aided design software for Linux
Computer-aided engineering software for Linux
Articles with underscores in the title